The Freedom Party was a clandestine political party in the Moldovan SSR.

Membership
The founders members were: Constantin Condrat (born 1914, Soroca), Ion Istrati (b. 1929), Nicolae Istrati (b. 1926), Victor Andreev (b. 1923, Mănoileşti), Vladimir Bivol (b. 1923, Cojuşna), Tudor Goncearencu (b. 1915, Gălăţeni), Andrei Sănduţă (b. 1921, Ialoveni).

Bibliography 
 Elena Postică, Rezistenţa antisovietică în Basarabia. 1945–1950, Chişinău, 1997 (lucrare elaborată în baza unor documente de arhivă inedite, în special din Arhiva Ministerului Securităţii Naţionale a Republicii Moldova, abreviat: A.M.S.N.R.M.),
 Elena Postică, "Partidul Libertăţii": reafirmarea ideii naţionale, Ţara, 1995, 1-5 decembrie,
 Istoria Partidului Comunist al Moldovei, Chişinău, 1968,
 Istoria RSS Moldoveneşti, vol.2, Chişinău, 1970,
 Totalitarianism Archives, volume IV-V, nr 13–14, winter 1996-spring 1997,
 Mihai Gribincea, Basarabia în primii ani de ocupaţie sovietică.1944–1950, Cluj-Napoca, 1995,
 Valeriu Pasat, Trudnie stranitsi istorii Moldovi. 1940–1950 [Culegere de documente] (Pages difficiles d'histoire de la Moldavie), Moscova, Ed. Terra, 1994,
 Istoria Basarabiei de la origini până la 1994, (coordonator Ioan Scurtu), București, 1994,
 Mitru Ghiţiu, Unele aspecte din mişcarea de rezistenţă antisovietică în Basarabia postbelică, în Analele Sighet 2, Instaurarea comunismului – între rezistenţă şi represiune, 1995,
 Mihai Gribincea, Agricultural Collectivization in Moldavia: Basarabia During Stalinism, 1944–1950, East European Monographs, 1996.

References

External links
Transferurile masive de populaţie în Moldova Sovietică

Anti-communism in Moldova
Anti-communist parties
Clandestine groups
Defunct political parties in Moldova
Political parties disestablished in 1950
Political parties established in 1949
Pro-independence parties in the Soviet Union